Evelyn Dubrow (March 6, 1911 – June 20, 2006) was a labour lobbyist for the International Ladies' Garment Workers' Union.

Early life 
Dubrow was born on March 6, 1911, in Passaic, New Jersey. She attended New York University, where she studied journalism.

Later life 
She received the Presidential Medal of Freedom from President Bill Clinton in 1999. She died on June 20, 2006, in Washington, D.C.

See also

 Lobbying in the United States

External links

Obituary from The New York Times
 from the Associated Press

American women journalists
American trade union leaders
American lobbyists
Jewish-American history
New York University alumni
People from Passaic, New Jersey
Presidential Medal of Freedom recipients
1911 births
2006 deaths
International Ladies Garment Workers Union leaders
20th-century American women
20th-century American people
21st-century American women